The Wood Mountain Formation is a geologic formation in Saskatchewan. It preserves fossils dating back to the Neogene period.

See also

 List of fossiliferous stratigraphic units in Saskatchewan

References
 

Neogene Saskatchewan